Choir of Young Believers was the musical project of singer, writer and guitarist Jannis Noya Makrigiannis from Copenhagen, Denmark. The band, which consisted of Makrigiannis along with a rotating cast of supporting players, has had multiple No 1 hits in their home country of Denmark and was named the "Best New Act" at the 2009 Danish Music Awards. COYB’s music combines folk melodies, orchestral instrumentation, and dark lyrics.

History
After the breakup of his previous band, Lake Placid, in 2006, Makrigiannis moved to the Greek island of Samos and began developing his own solo material. Upon his return to Copenhagen, Makrigiannis gathered musicians and friends to form Choir of Young Believers. The group released the EP Burn the Flag in 2007, with the single "Sharpen Your Knife" receiving heavy play on Danish Radio. In September 2008, the band released its first full length album, This Is for the White in Your Eyes, which was nominated for six Danish Music Awards and won the "Best New Act" category.

COYB performed at the 2009 SXSW music festival, after which it was signed to US label Ghostly International who released This Is for the White in Your Eyes in North America on 18 August 2009. The next album released was Rhine Gold in March 2012. The band's third studio album, Grasque, was released on 19 February 2016.

The song "Hollow Talk", from the debut album, was used over the opening and the closing credits of the Danish–Swedish police series The Bridge (2011, 2013, 2015, 2018).

Makrigiannis died shortly before New Year's Eve in 2022 after a short period of illness.

Members

Current & Past members
 Jannis Noya Makrigiannis: vocals, guitar, piano, bass, keyboard, percussion (died 2022)
 Cæcilie Trier: cello, backing vocals
 Jakob Millung: bass
 Bo Rande: brass instruments, keyboard, backing vocals
 Sonja Labianca: piano
 Lasse Herbst: percussion
 Casper Henning Hansen: drums, percussion
 Aske Zidore: guitar, production
 Anders Rhedin: keyboard, drums, guitar, percussion, backing vocals (until 2008)
 Mette Sand Hersoug: violin, flute, backing vocals (until 2008)
 Fridolin Nordsø: bass, drums, percussion, trumpet, flute, keyboard, backing vocals (until 2008)
 Nicolai Koch: piano (until 2008)
 Frederik Nordsø: percussion (until 2008)

Discography

Studio albums
 2008: This Is for the White in Your Eyes
 2012: Rhine Gold
 2016: Grasque
 2022: Holy Smoke

EPs
 2007: Burn the Flag (EP)
 2007: Choir vs. Evil (EP)

Singles
 2007: "Sharpen Your Knife"
 2009: "Action/Reaction" (Ghostly International)
 2009: "Next Summer" (Ghostly International)
 2014: "Hollow Talk"
 2015: "Face Melting"
 2015: "Jeg ser dig"
 2015: "Serious Lover"

Tracks featured
 2009: "Ghostly Essentials: Avant-Pop One" (Ghostly International)
 2009: Numb3rs, end credits for series 6 episode 1 – "Hollow Talk" from the album "This Is for the White in Your Eyes" (Ghostly International)
 2009:"One Tree Hill", season 7 episode 3-"Hollow Talk" plays where Haley and Nathan are arguing
 2010: Submarino, Danish drama film directed by Thomas Vinterberg
 2011: The Bridge, theme and end credits – "Hollow Talk"
 2014: Reign, season 1 episode 18 – Hollow Talk plays at the end of the episode.

Reviews
 Guardian review of Choir of Young Believers
 NPR review of This Is for the White in Your Eyes

Sources
 Choir of Young Believers Page at Ghostly International
 Identity Theory Interview with Jannis Noya Makrigiannis
 Choir of Young Believers on Iceland Airwaves
 Choir of Young Believers on MySpace

References

External links
 Choir of Young Believers at MySpace
 Choir of Young Believers at Last.fm
 Choir of Young Believers at Ghostly International
 
 

Danish musical groups